Ksenia Vasilyevna Krasilnikova (born 18 June 1991) is a Russian former pair skater. With Konstantin Bezmaternikh, she is the 2008 World Junior champion.

Career 
Krasilnikova teamed up with Konstantin Bezmaternikh in 2003. The pair was coached by Valeri Tiukov and Valentina Tiukova in poor conditions in Perm. Although they placed second on the day, they were later awarded the 2007-2008 Junior Grand Prix Final title following the retroactive disqualification of Vera Bazarova / Yuri Larionov due to a positive doping sample from Larionov.

Krasilnikova / Bezmaternikh withdrew from the 2009 Nebelhorn Trophy after the short program – he injured ligaments in his right hand. Krasilnikova decided to retire from competitive skating after the 2009–2010 season due to a persistent back injury.

Programs 
(with Bezmaternikh)

Competitive highlights 
(with Bezmaternikh)

References

External links 
 

Russian female pair skaters
1991 births
Living people
Sportspeople from Krasnoyarsk
World Junior Figure Skating Championships medalists
Competitors at the 2009 Winter Universiade
20th-century Russian women
21st-century Russian women